Muhammad Yaqub (17 August 1926 – April 2014) was a Pakistani hurdler. He competed in the 400 metres hurdles at the 1956 Summer Olympics and the 1960 Summer Olympics.

References

External links

1926 births
2014 deaths
Athletes (track and field) at the 1956 Summer Olympics
Athletes (track and field) at the 1958 British Empire and Commonwealth Games
Athletes (track and field) at the 1960 Summer Olympics
Pakistani male hurdlers
Olympic athletes of Pakistan
Commonwealth Games competitors for Pakistan
20th-century Pakistani people